Élisa Servier is a French actor.

Life 
After a childhood spent in the countryside, near Paris, Elisa Servier debuted at the cinema in 1973, at the age of 18, in a comedy,  Le Chaud Lapin, by Pascal Thomas. She reports being raped during that film.

She appeared in the feature film with Bernard Ménez and Daniel Ceccaldi.  In 1978, she met Daniel Ceccaldi, as well as Pascal Thomas, who directed Confidences for Confidences, the story of a generation of women throughout the history of the three young sisters, suburbanites who became Parisian in the 1960s. She worked for seven years as a model, in Paris, Milan, Hamburg and New York.

She spent three years in comedy classes at Florent with Francis Huster, and in 1980, toured with David Hamilton in Tendres Cousines. She followed the same year with her first play, Le Garçon d'appartement, by Gérard Lauzier, directed by Daniel Auteuil at Petit-Marigny. In 1981, she played in Le Divan, by Remo Forlani, at the La Bruyère theater, alongside Roger Pierre and Isabelle Mergault, and under the direction of Pierre Mondy. Subsequently, she appeared in a hundred films and TV movies, including the great summer sagas of TF1 Wind of the harvest and Summer storms, by Jean Sagols, with Annie Girardot and Gerard Klein. She thus marks her presence at Central Nuit, alongside Michel Creton and Nestor Burma, Léo Mallet, where she played the role of Commissioner Niel against Guy Marchand.

Elisa Servier is also the mother of two children: a first boy, Julien, and a daughter, Manon de Toledo.

On the big screen, she appeared in We are not angels ... them either, by Michel Lang, where she plays the little sister of Sabine Azema, and in Pour bricks, you have nothing more .. ., of Édouard Molinaro, with Gérard Jugnot and Daniel Auteuil, with whom she appears again in A few days with me of Claude Sautet, in 1988. In 2010, she played in the comedy with Bienvenue aboard, by Eric Lavaine, alongside Valérie Lemercier, Franck Dubosc and Gérard Darmon. In 2013, along with Jean-Pierre Darroussin, Marc Lavoine, Bernard Campan and Eric Elmosnino, she played Sophie, in The Heart of Men 3, directed by Marc Esposito.

Filmography

Film 

 1974 : Le Chaud Lapin, de Pascal Thomas : Nathalie
 1979 : Confidences pour confidences, de Pascal Thomas : Florence
 1980 : Tendres Cousines, de David Hamilton : Claire
 1981 : On n'est pas des anges... elles non plus, de Michel Lang : Alicia
 1982 : Pour cent briques, t'as plus rien..., d'Édouard Molinaro : Caroline
 1983 : L'Été de nos quinze ans, de Marcel Jullian : Maud
 1984 : Le Garde du corps, de François Leterrier : Catherine
 1984 : Partenaires, de Claude d'Anna : Marie-Lou Pasquier
 1988 : Quelques jours avec moi de Claude Sautet : Lucie
 1997 : Bruits d'amour, de Jacques Otmezguine : Caro
 1998 : Nous sommes tous des gagnants, de Claude Dray (court-métrage) 
 1999 : Peut-être, de Cédric Klapisch : la mère réveillon
 2011 : Bienvenue à bord d'Éric Lavaine : Caroline Berthelot
 2013 : Le Cœur des hommes 3 de Marc Esposito : Sophie

Television 

 1979 : La Fabrique, un conte de Noël, de Pascal Thomas (Téléfilm) 
 1981 : Au théâtre ce soir : Mort ou vif de Max Régnier, mise en scène Christian Duroc, réalisation Pierre Sabbagh, théâtre Marigny : Michèle Martineau
 1982 : Le Divan (téléfilm) : Dorothée
 1987 : Chahut-bahut, de Jean Sagols (série télévisée) 
 1988 : Le Vent des moissons, de Jean Sagols (série télévisée) : Sylvie Leclerc
 1988 : Loft Story, de Stéphane Bertin et Boramy Tioulong (série télévisée)
 1988 : Anges et loups, de Boramy Tioulong (série télévisée) : Camille
 1989 : L'Agence, de Jean Sagols (série télévisée)
 1989 : Orages d'été, de Jean Sagols (série télévisée) : Martine
 1990 : Orages d'été, avis de tempête, de Jean Sagols (série télévisée) : Martine
 1991 : Duplex (téléfilm) : Liza
 1992 : Quand épousez-vous ma femme ?, de Daniel Colas (téléfilm) : Nadette
 1993 : Martineau... et le portrait de femme, de Daniel Moosmann (téléfilm) : Catherine Trigou
 1993 : Regarde-moi quand je te quitte, de Philippe de Broca (téléfilm) : Angélique
 1993 : Pris au piège, de Michel Favart (téléfilm) : Le juge d'instruction
 1993 : Les Grandes Marées, de Jean Sagols (série télévisée) : Brigitte Maréchal
 1993 : Les Noces de carton, de Pierre Sisser (téléfilm) : Samantha
 1995 : La Rose noire, Jean Sagols (téléfilm) : Lily Lagarde
 1995 : Carreau d'as, de Laurent Carcélès (téléfilm) : Ginny
 1995 : Des mots qui déchirent, de Marco Pauly (téléfilm) : Martine Lachatre
 1996 : La Guerre des poux, de Jean-Luc Trotignon (téléfilm) : Martine
 1997 : Bonjour Antoine, de Radu Mihaileanu (téléfilm) :  Lacroix
 1998 : Mauvaises affaires, de Jean-Louis Bertuccelli (téléfilm) : Hélène
 1998 : La Dernière des romantiques, de Joyce Buñuel (téléfilm) : Sophie
 1998 - 2000 : Cap des Pins, d'Emmanuelle Dubergey, Bernard Dumont, Emmanuel Fonlladosa, Pascal Heylbroeck et Dominique Masson (série télévisée) : Isabelle Mori
 1999 : Madame le Proviseur, de Jean-Marc Seban (série télévisée) : Marianne
 1999 : Maître Da Costa, de Nicolas Ribowski et Jean-Louis Bertuccelli (série télévisée) : Carine Moulin
 1999 : Revient le jour, de Jean-Louis Lorenzi (téléfilm) : Rose-Marie Rénal
 2000 : Affaires familiales (série télévisée) : La présidente Irène Jaffry
 2000 - 2003 : Nestor Burma, de Jacob Berger (série télévisée) : Commissaire Niel
 2001 - 2008 : Central nuit, de Pascale Dallet et Franck Vestiel (série télévisée) : Martine Davrat
 2003 : Impair et Père, de Jean-Luc Moreau (téléfilm) : Sophie Paillard
 2003 : L'Instit, de Jean Sagols (série télévisée) : Françoise
 2005 : Faites comme chez vous !, de Pascal Heylbroeck (série télévisée) : Viviane Bernardy
 2006 : Une juge sous influence, de Jean-Louis Bertuccelli (téléfilm) : Valérie Léoni
 2006 : Louis Page, d'Antoine Lorenzi (série télévisée) : Sonia
 2006 : Capitaine Casta : Amélie a disparu, de Joyce Buñuel (téléfilm) : Françoise Casta
 2007 : Julie Lescaut (série télévisée) : Isabelle Gaudel 
 2008 : Les belles-sœurs (téléfilm) : Christelle
 2009 : Profilage (série télévisée) : Régine
 2010 : Camping Paradis (série télévisée - saison 2, épisode 3) : Mme Bellegarde
 2010 : Joséphine, ange gardien (série télévisée) : Corinne Durieu
 2011 : Le Grand Restaurant II, de Gérard Pullicino (téléfilm)
 2013 : Enquêtes réservées (série télévisée)
 2016 : Camping Paradis (saison 7, épisode 5) : Sylvie
 2018 : Commissaire Magellan (série) : Crossover Mongeville et Magellan (épisode Un amour de jeunesse) : Delphine

Theater 

 1980 : Le Garçon d'appartement de Gérard Lauzier, mise en scène Daniel Auteuil, Petit Marigny
 1981 : Le Divan de Remo Forlani, mise en scène Max Douy, théâtre La Bruyère
 1984 : On m'appelle Émilie de Maria Pacôme, mise en scène Jean-Luc Moreau, théâtre Saint-Georges
 1991 : Quand épousez-vous ma femme ? de Jean-Bernard Luc et Jean-Pierre Conty, mise en scène Daniel Colas
 1996 : Panique au Plazza, de Ray Cooney, mise en scène Pierre Mondy, théâtre Marigny
 2001 : Impair et Père de Ray Cooney, mise en scène Jean-Luc Moreau, théâtre de la Michodière
 2004 : Lune de miel de Noël Coward, mise en scène Bernard Murat, théâtre Édouard VII
 2005 : Amitiés sincères de François Prévôt-Leygonie et Stephan Archinard, mise en scène Bernard Murat, théâtre Édouard VII
 2007 : Les Belles-sœurs d'Éric Assous, mise en scène Jean-Luc Moreau, théâtre Saint-Georges
 2008-2009 : Secret de famille d'Éric Assous, mise en scène Jean-Luc Moreau, théâtre des Variétés, tournée
 2010 : Le Technicien d'Éric Assous, mise en scène Jean-Luc Moreau, théâtre du Palais-Royal
 2011 : Une journée ordinaire d'Éric Assous, mise en scène Jean-Luc Moreau, théâtre des Bouffes-Parisiens
 2011 : Le Coup de la cigogne de Jean-Claude Isler, mise en scène Jean-Luc Moreau, théâtre Saint-Georges
 2013 : Une journée ordinaire d'Éric Assous, mise en scène Jean-Luc Moreau, tournée
 2017 - 2018 : Au revoir... et merci! de Bruno Druart, mise en scène Didier Brengarth, tournée

References

External links 

 
 
 http://www.allocine.fr/personne/fichepersonne-26395/filmographie/ 
 http://www.purepeople.com/media/la-comedienne-elisa-servier-et-son_m209749

1955 births
Living people
French film actresses
French stage actresses
French television actresses
20th-century French actresses
21st-century French actresses
People from Villepinte, Seine-Saint-Denis